The 1911–12 United States collegiate men's ice hockey season was the 18th season of collegiate ice hockey.

Regular season

Standings

References

1911–12 NCAA Standings

External links
College Hockey Historical Archives

 
College